Legare Stadium is a sports venue in Gobabis, Omaheke Region, Namibia.  the stadium is dilapidated and not usable as a sports venue.

References

Buildings and structures in Omaheke Region
Gobabis
Football venues in Namibia